An American Tail is a franchise based on the 1986 animated film of the same name directed by Don Bluth and produced by Sullivan Bluth Studios/Amblin Entertainment.

The franchise follows the adventures of Fievel Mousekewitz, a Ukrainian-Jewish mouse immigrant to the United States in 1885. The franchise opened up a couple of former attractions at Universal Studios Hollywood and Universal Studios Florida  including "Fievel's Playland" and "An American Tail Show".

Media

Films

An American Tail 
An American Tail is a 1986 film which follows Fievel and his family as they immigrate from Russia to the United States and how he subsequently gets lost and aims to reunite with them.

An American Tail: Fievel Goes West 
An American Tail: Fievel Goes West is a 1991 western sequel to An American Tail. This movie has been exhibited four times at the Jimmy Stewart Museum since 2015, a dedication to the late James Stewart in his final role.

An American Tail: The Treasure of Manhattan Island 
An American Tail: The Treasure of Manhattan Island is a 1998 direct-to-video sequel. This film contributes Elaine Bilstad’s final appearance, releasing it posthumously in the United States in early 2000.

An American Tail: The Mystery of the Night Monster 
An American Tail: The Mystery of the Night Monster is a 1999 direct-to-video sequel, released in the United States in mid 2000.

Video games

An American Tail: The Computer Adventures of Fievel and His Friends 
An American Tail: The Computer Adventures of Fievel and His Friends is a 1993 Microsoft DOS point-and-click adventure game developed by Capstone Software and Manley & Associates, Inc., based on both of the first two An American Tail movies.

An American Tail: Fievel Goes West 
An American Tail: Fievel Goes West is a 1994 Super NES video game based on the film of the same name.

An American Tail Movie Book 
An American Tail Movie Book is a 1998 Interactive storybook for Windows and Macintosh developed by Wayforward Technologies and published by Sound Source Interactive.

An American Tail: Fievel's Gold Rush 
An American Tail: Fievel's Gold Rush is a 2002 platform game for Game Boy Advance developed by Hokus-Pokus.

An American Tail 
An American Tail is a 2007 platform game developed by Data Design Interactive and published by Blast! Entertainment based on the film of the same name. It was released exclusively in Europe. The game consists of ten levels and four bonus levels. In each level the player must guide Fievel on a preset path from start to finish. The player can collect stars or pieces of cheese along the way. Gameplay takes different forms in different levels, such as running in a bubble, riding the back of Henri the pigeon, parachuting downwards and others.

Music

"Somewhere Out There" 
"Somewhere Out There" is the theme song of An American Tail, performed by Linda Ronstadt and James Ingram.

"Dreams to Dream" 
"Dreams to Dream" is the theme song of An American Tail: Fievel Goes West, performed by Linda Ronstadt.

Other

Fievel's American Tails 
Fievel's American Tails is a 1992 spin-off TV series and continuation of An American Tail: Fievel Goes West. This series remained abandoned after the release of the direct-to-video sequels until NBCUniversal regained rights to the series in 2020 and is now available on Peacock.

An American Tail Theatre 
An American Tail Theatre was a live stage show based on An American Tail: Fievel Goes West at various Universal Parks & Resorts theme parks that ran from 1990 to 1992.

Cast and characters

Crew

Critical response

References 

Film franchises introduced in 1986
Film franchises
Universal Pictures franchises
 
Films adapted into television shows